Nerts (US), or Racing Demon (UK) is a fast-paced multiplayer card game involving multiple decks of playing cards. It is often described as a competitive form of Patience or Solitaire. In the game, players or teams race to get rid of the cards in their "Nerts pile" by playing them in sequences from aces upwards, either into their personal area or in a communal central area. Each player or team uses their own deck of playing cards throughout the game.

The number of players or teams that can play in a game is limited only by the number of decks and the amount of space available.

Names 
The game was invented in England in the 1890s as Racing Demon and is still called by that name in the UK. In the US, it was also called Pounce in the 1930s and, more recently, Nerts, but the name Racing Demon was still current in the 1960s.  David Parlett says that today it is also known as Pounce internationally and Nerts in the US. The game also goes under other names including: Peanuts Racing Canfield, Scramble, Squeal, Scrooge and Nertz.

History
Card game expert David Parlett says the game of Racing Demon is of English origin and was created in the 1890s.  It is recorded as Racing Demon in the 1920s and 1930s with accounts soon following in American publications from 1934 onwards under the name Pounce. In 1927, Robert Hülsemann published a description of the game in German under the name Rasender Teufel ("Racing Demon"). Meanwhile, the American "National Nertz Association" blog says it is unaware of any known inventor or specific date of creation for the game, but that it has been around since the 1940s. Today proprietary Racing Demon cards are produced for it, consisting of ordinary 52-card Anglo-American pattern packs with different coloured backs.

Play 
A game of Nerts is typically played as a series of hands. Between hands, scores are tallied and the cards are sorted and given back to the players or teams that played them. After the cards are returned, the decks are shuffled and set up for the next hand and the process is repeated until a player wins.

During a hand, players do not take turns: instead, they play simultaneously, and may play cards onto one another's Lake cards. There are four areas that a player or team uses: the Lake, the River, the Stream, and the Nerts pile. The Lake is the central area, used to score points, which any player or team may use by building suited piles in ascending order without doubles. The River is a 4-columned personal area that a player or team uses by cascading and/or playing cards from columns of alternating color and descending order (like the tableau piles in Solitaire). The Stream is a pile that is continually flipped (usually in groups of three cards at a time) in search of cards to play into the Lake or River. The Nerts pile is a 13-card pile that players try to get rid of cards from one at a time, from the top of the pile, into available Lake or River destinations. The first player or team to successfully get rid of their Nerts pile calls or shouts "Nerts". Once "Nerts" is called all play for that hand stops.

In a hand, players or teams earn points determined by a formula using the number of cards played into the Lake subtracted by twice the number of cards remaining in the Nerts pile. Awarding 10-point bonuses to players or teams that call Nerts is a fairly common practice. Generally a game is played to a set score like 100 points, in which case players will play as many hands as needed until a winner emerges. Sometimes the endgame condition is when the difference between the highest score and the lowest score exceeds some value, such as 100. On occasion, players keep tallies of games won instead of adding hand scores and then use the tallies to determine a winner. It is also common for players or teams to receive negative hand and game scores.

Pounce 
The rules for the similar game Pounce, described by Breen in 1934, may be summarised as follows:

Each player has a shuffled pack of cards. The top thirteen are placed face up in front of the player as the 'pounce pile'. Then four cards are placed in a row face up beside it. Players take cards are taken, three at a time, from their remaining stock (the cards left in the hand) and used to build on any Aces in the middle or on the four cards in the row. Cards must be built in alternating colour and descending order. Whoever sheds their pounce pile first wins, announcing this by shouting “Pounce!”  The winner scores one for every card in the middle of the table and 10 for 'pounce'. Each loser scores one for every card in the centre, but loses two for each card remaining in the pounce pile.

Organization

United States 
In the USA the National Nertz Association website has published an "Official Nertz Rulebook". Pagat, the leading card game website, has also posted rules for the game of Nerts.

Commercial versions

Nerts-inspired retail game sets include Ligretto, Dutch Blitz, Solitaire Frenzy, Wackee Six, Nay Jay! and Perpetual Commotion, sharing the same basic elements with some differences.

Electronic Nerts
The first known electronic Nerts game was Nertz! The Card Game by John Ronnander and Majicsoft for the Atari ST system and was released for purchase in 1995.

In January 2021, Zachtronics released a version of Nerts, NERTS! Online, on Steam, which is based on an internal version developed over the previous year.

See also
 Canfield also known as Demon
 Dutch Blitz, a similar game produced by the Pennsylvania Dutch
 Ligretto, a similar game produced in Germany
 Speed
 Solitaire Showdown, a similar game played online in Windows Live Messenger
 Solitaire terminology, which shares many terms with Nerts.
 List of patience and solitaire games

Footnotes

References

Literature 
 Breen, Mary J. (1934). Partners in Play: Recreation for Young Men and Young Women Together. National Recreation Association, A.S. Barnes.
 Hülsemann, Robert (1927). Das Buch der Spiele für Familie und Gesellschaft. 1st edn. Leipzig: Hesse & Becker.
 
 Sprigge, Elizabeth (1927). A Shadowy Third. Knopf.
 Woodward, Elizabeth (1946). "Multiple Pounce" in Let's Have a Party. Thomas Y. Crowell. pp. 35–36.

External links

The National Nertz Association – An organization devoted to Nerts players.
Pagat's Rules for Nerts – Contains detailed rules for hundreds of card games.
Variations for Nertz at Free Forums – Lists many Nerts variations.

Board games introduced in the 1940s
English card games
Competitive patience card games